Besançon Football is a French football club based in Besançon. It plays at the Stade Léo Lagrange and plays in the Championnat National 3, the fifth tier in the French football league system.

The club was formed in June 2014 as Besançon FC, having evolved from the football section of Besançon ASPTT, whose place in Championnat de France Amateur 2 it took for the 2014–15 season.

In May 2017 Besançon FC merged with local club Promo Sports Besançon to form Besançon Football.

Current squad
As of 6 March 2018.

References

External links
  
 ESPN Reference: https://africa.espn.com/football/player/matches/_/id/232004/jorys-adjakly

 
Besançon
Besançon
Football clubs in Bourgogne-Franche-Comté